The Milwaukee Brewers Major League Baseball (MLB) franchise of the National League (NL) has played in Milwaukee, Wisconsin, since 1970. The team was established in 1969 as the Seattle Pilots in Seattle, Washington, and they became the Brewers after relocating to Wisconsin in 1970. The franchise played in the American League (AL) until 1998 when it moved to the National League in conjunction with a major league realignment. As of the completion of the 2022 season, the Brewers have played 8,514 regular-season games and compiled a win–loss record of 4,123–4,391. Combining all 8,563 regular-season and postseason games, the team has an all-time record of 4,144–4,419.

The franchise posted losing records each of their first nine seasons. Their first winning season occurred in 1978 when they finished at 93–69 (.574). Three years later, the Brewers qualified for their first MLB postseason by winning the second half 1981 AL East Division title in a season which had been shortened by the 1981 Major League Baseball strike. They lost the American League Division Series to the New York Yankees, three games to two. The following year, Milwaukee won the AL East title and then the 1982 American League Championship Series versus the California Angels, three games to two. In that year's World Series, the Brewers faced the National League Champion St. Louis Cardinals. The series went to a decisive game seven and resulted in a Brewers World Series loss. 

The team soon began a 25-year postseason drought that stood as the third-longest in the expanded-postseason era. Milwaukee returned to the playoffs in 2008 by winning the National League Wild Card. The Brewers lost the National League Division Series (NLDS) to the Philadelphia Phillies, three games to one. They won the 2011 NL Central Division title and defeated the Arizona Diamondbacks, three games to two, in the NLDS. Their postseason run was ended by the St. Louis Cardinals, who won the National League Championship Series (NLCS), four games to two.

In 2018, Milwaukee finished the regular-season tied with the Chicago Cubs for first place in the NL Central. The Brewers defeated the Cubs in a tie-breaker game, 3–1, securing the division title and relegating Chicago to the wild card game. Milwaukee then swept the Colorado Rockies in the best-of-five NLDS, advancing to the NLCS, where they lost to the Los Angeles Dodgers, four games to three. The following year, they secured one of two NL wild card berths but lost the 2019 National League Wild Card Game to the Washington Nationals, 4–3. The Brewers won another wild card spot in the 2020 season, which had been shortened due to the COVID-19 pandemic. They lost the 2020 NL Wild Card Series versus the Los Angeles Dodgers, two games to zero. Milwaukee won the 2021 NL Central Division title but lost the NLDS versus the Atlanta Braves, 3–1.

The Brewers' best season record occurred in 2011 when they finished 96–66 (.593). Conversely, their lowest season record was 56–106 (.346) in 2002.

Table key

Season-by-season records

Postseason records
The Brewers have made the postseason eight times in their history, with the first being in 1981 and the most recent being in 2021.

Franchise totals

Notes

References
Specific

General

 
Major League Baseball teams seasons
Seasons